Skeabost is a township, at the head of the sea loch, Loch Snizort Beag in the southern end of the Trotternish peninsula on the island of Skye in the Scottish Highlands and is in the Scottish council area of Highland. It was the birthplace of Màiri Mhòr nan Òran.

The village of Carbost lies directly east along the A850 road.

See also
Snizort Cathedral
Snizort Free Church

References

Populated places in the Isle of Skye